Tatum is a Town in Northwest Province, Cameroon.

External links
Science labs for high schoolers in rural Cameroon
Images of Tatum (PowerPoint format)

Populated places in Northwest Region (Cameroon)